Łukasz Skowron (born 17 March 1991) is a Polish professional footballer who plays as a goalkeeper. Besides Poland, he has played in Cyprus, Portugal, and the Republic of Ireland. He last played for St Patrick's Athletic of the League of Ireland Premier Division in their 2017 season.

References

External links 
 
 

1991 births
Living people
People from Sierpc
Polish footballers
Polish expatriate footballers
Association football goalkeepers
Wisła Płock players
Polonia Warsaw players
Radomiak Radom players
Jagiellonia Białystok players
Arka Gdynia players
Aris Limassol FC players
St Patrick's Athletic F.C. players
Ekstraklasa players
Cypriot First Division players
League of Ireland players
Expatriate footballers in Cyprus
Sportspeople from Masovian Voivodeship
Expatriate association footballers in the Republic of Ireland